Vinson & Elkins LLP (or V&E) is an international law firm with approximately 700 lawyers worldwide headquartered in Downtown Houston, Texas.

The firm has offices in major energy, financial, and political centers worldwide, including Austin, Dallas, Dubai, Houston, London, Los Angeles, New York City, Richmond, Riyadh, San Francisco, Tokyo, and Washington, D.C.

Profile

Founding
The firm was founded in Houston, Texas, in 1917 by Judge James A. Elkins and William A. Vinson.

Leadership
In May 2021, it was announced that the firm elected current partners Keith Fullenweider as chair and Jim Fox, Michael Holmes and Hilary Preston as vice chairs. The change took effect on January 1, 2022.  The firm's former chairman is Mark Kelly and its managing partner was Scott Wulfe.

Practice areas
The firm practices in numerous legal fields, particularly those that pertain to the energy industry, with more than 400 lawyers involved in energy-related legal work. The firm was rated the most prestigious firm in Texas for the fifth year in a row, as well as for having the nation’s strongest practice for Energy, Oil, & Gas for the eighth consecutive year. The firm is highly ranked within Chamber and Partners legal rankings as a leading firm in Corporate and Tax areas, collectively achieving 10 Band 1 practice rankings in the 2021 guide. The firm is recognized as "The World's Leading Energy Law Firm" by Euromoney Magazine 2010 - 2011.  In 2011, Chambers & Partners recognized V&E globally, as the leader in Projects & Energy: Oil & Gas.

Diversity
On January 12, 2022, Vinson & Elkins became the founding sponsor of The University of Texas School of Law's new Pipeline Program. The firm made a $1 million commitment to support the program. In 2021, Vinson & Elkins was named as a leader in diversity equity and inclusion by Bloomberg as part of Bloomberg Law's DEI Framework study. In 2009, the firm was again named a Community of Respect by the Anti-Defamation League, a designation V&E has maintained since the program's inception in 2006, and is also the two-time recipient of the Thomas L. Sager Award for the South/Southwest Region by the Minority Corporate Counsel Association for the firm's sustained commitment to diversity.

In 2001, V&E received negative attention for its role as legal advisor to Enron, the failed Houston-based energy company. During the years following Enron's collapse, Vinson & Elkins was the subject of a number of claims, and its representation of Enron endured scrutiny by news organizations, the U.S. Congress, and federal agencies. Vinson & Elkins was voluntarily dismissed without payment in January 2007 from the last significant litigation involving the Enron collapse. The law firm agreed to pay $30 million to the failed energy company's bankruptcy estate to avoid a lawsuit claiming it aided in the company's downfall.

International
V&E has been active and has had an office in London for more than 50 years. V&E has an active practice in China advising Chinese companies on energy-related mergers and acquisitions. The firm has represented clients throughout Asia for more than 30 years. V&E's office in Tokyo services local commercial hubs, as well as the broader Asia Pacific region. The practice also has a significant presence beyond office locations, with lawyers frequently advising on matters in Australia, India, Korea, and Southeast Asia.

Managing partners
Keith Fullenweider (2021–present)
Mark Kelly and Scott Wulfe (2012–2020)
Joseph C. Dilg (2002–2011)
Harry M. Reasoner (1992–2001)
J. Evans Attwell (1981–91)
A. Frank Smith Jr. (1971–81)
Lewis White (1962–71)
Raybourne Thompson Sr. (1959–62)
Robert A. Shepherd Sr. (1952–59)
Warren Dale (office manager 1947-52)
James A. Elkins (1929–47)

Notable alumni 
Amanda K. Edwards, Houston City Council (2016–20), candidate for 2020 United States Senate election in Texas
Griff Aldrich, head basketball coach, Longwood University
J. Evans Attwell, former V&E managing partner; Chair, Harris County Hospital District; and partial owner, Houston Astros (1978–1994)
Howard H. Baker Jr., former U.S. Senator; White House Chief of Staff (1987–88)
John B. Connally Jr., Presidential candidate (1980); Secretary of the Treasury (1971–72); Governor of Texas (1962–69); and Secretary of the Navy (1961–62)
Carol E. Dinkins, Deputy Attorney General of Department of Justice (1984–85); Assistant Attorney General in charge of the Environment and Natural Resources Division for Department of Justice (1981–83)
James A. Elkins, Co-Founder, Vinson & Elkins LLP; Founder, First City Bank
Lizzie Fletcher, Congresswoman from Houston (2019–present)
Alberto Gonzales, U.S. Attorney General (2005–07); White House Counsel (2001–05); Texas State Supreme Court (1999–2001); State Secretary of State Texas (1997–99); General Counsel to Governor George W. Bush (1995–97)
Theodore "Ted" W. Kassinger, Deputy Secretary, U.S. Department of Commerce (2004-); General Counsel, U.S. Department of Commerce (2001–04)
Ron Kirk, Mayor of Dallas, Texas (1995–2001); U.S. Trade Representative (2009-13)
George Peddy, attorney with Vinson & Elkins (1925-1942); Texas politician
Claude Pollard, Co-Founder Vinson, Elkins, Wood and Pollard, Attorney General of Texas (1927–1929)
Jeff Smisek, former chairman, president and CEO, Continental Airlines
Mark Tuohey, candidate for Attorney General of the District of Columbia
Jimmy Blacklock, Associate Justice of the Texas Supreme Court

See also

List of largest United States-based law firms by profits per partner

References

External links
Vinson and Elkins official website
Yahoo! - Vinson & Elkins LLP Company Profile
NALP Legal Employer Profile
Referenceforbusiness.com
Chambers & Partners USA and the Chambers Student Guide
The Handbook of Texas Online
Vinson & Elkins settles with Enron for $30 million

Law firms established in 1917
Law firms based in Houston
Foreign law firms with offices in Japan